Wontstop Record is an independent record label founded in 1998 by Emmanuel Anebsa in Bristol, United Kingdom. The label has produced and released 37 albums and 30 singles, including singles such as Junior Kelly's "Jah Know", Anthony B's "Make My Money" and Anebsa's "Change My Life". In 2016, the label released a compilation album featuring the work of Anebsa, Doniki,  Junior Kelly, Determine, Jah Mason and Turbulance.

According to a report in The Gleaner, the label has "built a reputation for hard-hitting dub and roots reggae music that elevates black consciousness".

Selected discography
Albums
Emmanuel Anebsa – To Be Humble
Emmanuel Anebsa – Smiling
Emmanuel Anebsa – We Got Problems
Emmanuel Anebsa – Ghetto Beats
Emmanuel Anebsa – Conscious Voices
Emmanuel Anebsa – St. Paul's Ghetto
Emmanuel Anebsa – Action Now
Emmanuel Anebsa – If You
Emmanuel Anebsa – Mr. Nobody

Singles
Junior Kelly – "Jah Know"
Anthony B – "Make My Money"
Emmanuel Anebsa ft. Turbulance – "We Wear It Well"
Emmanuel Anebsa ft. Doniki – “Fly to Zion"
Emmanuel Anebsa ft. Jah Mason – "Have Fi Pray"

See also
Black and White Café

References

External links
 Discogs for Wontstop Record

Record labels established in 1998
British independent record labels
Reggae record labels